Dunstan is a saint and 10th-century Archbishop of Canterbury.

Dunstan may also refer to:
Tdcvyx3cscnzsussjdcacrh

Name
Dunstan (surname)

Places
 Dunstan (New Zealand electorate)
 Lake Dunstan in New Zealand
 Dunstan, Northumberland, England, a small hamlet in north Northumberland, close to the village of Craster
 Dunstan, Maine, United States
 Clyde, New Zealand, formerly "Dunstan"

Plants
 Dunstan Chestnut (cultivar)

Fiction
Dunstan Cass, a greedy villain in the novel Silas Marner.
Dunstan, a historical novel about the 10th-century saint by British author Conn Iggulden.

Organizations
 St Dunstan's, a British charity for blind ex-service personnel

Educational institutions
 Saint Dunstan's University on Prince Edward Island
 St Dunstan's College in London
 Dunstan High School in Alexandra, New Zealand

Churches
UK - London
 St Dunstan's, Stepney
 St Dunstan-in-the-East
 St Dunstan-in-the-West
UK - other locations
 Church of St Dunstan, Liverpool
 St. Dunstan's, Canterbury
 St Dunstan's, Mayfield
Canada
 St. Dunstan's Basilica
USA
 St. Dunstan's Church of the Highlands Parish, Shoreline, Washington

See also
 Dunstanburgh Castle
 Dunston (disambiguation)